Arbogast & Bastian (also A&B Meats) was the name of a slaughterhouse and meat packing plant located in Allentown, Pennsylvania. Once a national leader in hog slaughtering, the company had the capacity to process most of the 850,000 hogs raised annually in Pennsylvania for slaughtering.  In its heyday, Arbogast & Bastian  slaughtered an average of 4,000 hogs daily.

Arbogast & Bastian, which was founded in 1887, operated for nearly one hundred years before filing for Chapter 11 bankruptcy in 1984, citing cash flow issues brought about by market turmoil and labor disputes.  The company filed Chapter 7 bankruptcy the following year.

With the exception of the company's offices and the storage building, the Arbogast & Bastian plant was demolished in the late 1990s.  These surviving offices were later incorporated into the America On Wheels museum, which was opened on the site of the former Arbogast & Bastian plant in 2008, while the storage building was redeveloped, becoming RB Collection – Ruozzi Brothers Collection: a trading and restoration center for classic and vintage automobiles along with Palazzo Reale, a residential complex with 7 luxury residences. Both buildings (RB Collection and America On Wheels Museum) form the Automobile Corner of America.

History

The Arbogast & Bastian Company was founded in 1887 by  Wilson Arbogast and Morris Clinton Bastian.  Arbogast, who was born in Freeburg, Snyder County, Pennsylvania, in 1851, was a school teacher by training who entered the wholesale provisioning business in the early 1880s in Phillipsburg, New Jersey.  Bastian, who was born in Lower Macungie Township, Lehigh County, Pennsylvania, in 1859, operated a general store in Allentown.

The two partners built a two-story building and stable at 25 Hamilton Street in Allentown, purchased two horses, and started supplying provisions and lard to local businesses and distributors.  They used their building as a smoke house, and offered "freshly-smoked" hams and bacon that were prepared using meat purchased ready-cured from other suppliers.  Ready-cured meat is that which, after slaughter and butchery, has been treated by curing in order to prevent the growth of bacteria and to reduce the opportunity for botulism to grow, allowing for much safer transport and storage.  This grew into a strong business for Arbogast & Bastian, as previously these goods had to be imported from larger cities, such as New York City and Philadelphia, and suffered in freshness and quality because of the additional time and handling required to get the finished product to Allentown.

In 1890, the company added a hog slaughtering department, in order to offer fresh pork and sausages to their customers.  The capacity of the plant increased from 150 hogs per week at inception, to over 1,500 hogs per week in 1905.  Pork brands offered included "Pure Home Rendered Lard" and "Old Dutch" hams and bacon.  With their venture in pork successful, Arbogast & Bastian soon expanded in a similar manner with beef, lamb, and mutton, first by purchasing ready-cured meat from suppliers in the West to learn the trade, then by building a full-scale abattoir and cold-storage facilities on-site.  By 1905, the company was processing over 150 head of cattle, and a similar number of lambs and sheep, weekly.

Arbogast & Bastian Company was formally incorporated in the Commonwealth of Pennsylvania, with $200,000 in capital ($ million in  dollars, adjusted for inflation.), on June 19, 1902.  The additional capital raised by the corporation was used to purchase more land and to build larger refrigeration facilities and a power plant.  By 1905, Arbogast & Bastian's revenues exceeded $1 million per year ($ million in  dollars, adjusted for inflation.)

The large Arbogast & Bastian facility now occupied a prominent location at Hamilton and Front streets in Allentown, along the Lehigh River.  The facility received livestock and transported goods via tracks run to the plant by the Lehigh Valley Railroad.  On July 14, 1905, a large fire destroyed the original Arbogast & Bastian plant and the company rebuilt a larger, more modern facility. It was the first reinforced concrete meat packing plant in the United States.  The Arbogast & Bastian plant, which allowed for more sanitary and safer operations, was designed and built in direct response to the unsanitary conditions in Chicago's meat packing plants exposed by Upton Sinclair in his book, The Jungle, which led to the passage of the Meat Inspection Act and the Pure Food and Drug Act of 1906.

During World War II, 70 percent of Arbogast & Bastian's output went to the United States armed forces and through the Lend-Lease program to the United Kingdom, the Soviet Union, China, France and other Allied nations.  By 1973, Arbogast & Bastian had 700 employees processing 160 million pounds (73 million kg) of meat a year, and the company had the capacity to butcher 7,200 hogs and 1,000 cattle a week.

Arbogast & Bastian filed for Chapter 11 bankruptcy on May 11, 1984, citing cash flow issues brought about by "two years of turbulent market conditions in the pork industry," a labor dispute with the Teamsters labor union and the recent shutdown of A&B's slaughtering operations.  The bankruptcy was immediately triggered because one of the company's customers had issued a stop-payment on $800,000 worth of checks paid to Arbogast & Bastian.  The firm's financial woes were further complicated by four large meat packing companies – Pork Cutters, Inc., Rotches Pork Packers, Inc., Otto Doerrer and Son, Inc. and Crissman, Inc. – who collectively failed to pay for nearly $5 million worth of pork carcasses and meat products purchased from Arbogast & Bastian in 1983 and 1984, according to charges made by the United States Department of Agriculture.   In total, about 380 workers lost their jobs.  Within months of filing for bankruptcy, Purity Bacon Products Corp., one of A&B's most profitable divisions, was sold for $1 million to an investor group led by Richard A. Strouce, the president of Arbogast & Bastian at the time it filed for bankruptcy.

The corporation filed for Chapter 7 liquidation on January 9, 1985.  With the closure of Arbogast & Bastian, only two major meat processing facilities remained operating in the state of Pennsylvania – Hatfield Quality Meats of Hatfield, Pennsylvania, and Martins Abattoir & Wholesale Meats, Inc., with headquarters in Godwin, North Carolina.

Legacy

As early as 1989, city officials in Allentown had announced plans to revitalize brownfield land along the Lehigh River, which included the abandoned Arbogast & Bastian plant.  This redevelopment, which was to be known as "Lehigh Landing," was originally to include a museum, a brewery, walking trails, a footbridge across the river, and a promenade for festivals.  Allentown businessman Raymond E. Holland, former president of Holiday Hair Fashions, had purchased the abandoned Arbogast & Bastian plant for $250,000 in 1985 and gave it to the Allentown Economic Development Corp. as a charitable contribution in 1990.  Development of "Lehigh Landing" was hindered by fundraising problems, environmental remediation issues, and even a national debate on pork barrel government spending.  The iconic Arbogast & Bastian plant remained vacant for over a decade, often the victim of vandalism and suspicious fires.  The plant was finally dismantled in late 1990s, and the company's large heart-shaped sign, long a fixture of the Allentown skyline, was taken down on June 30, 1998. The offices of Arbogast & Bastian, had not been torn down and were later incorporated into the America On Wheels museum, which was opened on the site of the former Arbogast & Bastian plant in 2008  and RB Collection-Ruozzi Brothers Collection / Palazzo Reale, occupying the redeveloped storage building.
Both buildings (RB Collection and America On Wheels Museum) form the Automobile Corner of America.

Bibliography

References

External links

1887 establishments in Pennsylvania
1985 disestablishments in Pennsylvania
Companies based in Allentown, Pennsylvania
Companies that filed for Chapter 11 bankruptcy in 1984
Companies that have filed for Chapter 7 bankruptcy
Defunct companies based in Pennsylvania
Food and drink companies established in 1887
Food and drink companies disestablished in 1985
History of Allentown, Pennsylvania
Meat companies of the United States